Prasad Vasant Sutar  is an Indian visual effects designer, coordinator and supervisor known for his works exclusively in Hindi cinema  Prasad currently works at NYVFXWala as a  visual effects designer, coordinator and supervisor collaboration with Ajay Devgan

Awards
Asian Film Awards (AFA) Best Visual Effects for film Bajirao Mastani
International Indian Film Academy (IIFA) Best Special Effects for film Bajirao Mastani
Screen Awards Best Special Effects for film Bajirao Mastani
Zee Cine Awards Best Special Effects for film Bajirao Mastani
FilmFare Awards Best Visual Effects for film Tanhaji: The Unsung Warrior

Filmography

References

External links 

Visual effects artists
Living people
Year of birth missing (living people)